Arlon is a city and municipality of Wallonia located in and capital of the province of Luxembourg in the Ardennes, Belgium. With a population of just over 28,000, it is the smallest provincial capital in Belgium. 
Arlon is also the capital of its cultural region: the Arelerland (Land of Arlon in Luxemburgish).

The municipality consists of the following districts: Arlon, Autelbas, Barnich, Bonnert, Guirsch, Heinsch, and Toernich. Other population centers include:

 Autelhaut
 Clairefontaine
 Fouches
 Frassem
 Freylange
 Hachy
 Heckbous
 Rosenberg
 Sampont
 Schoppach
 Sesselich
 Seymerich
 Stehnen
 Sterpenich
 Stockem
 Udange
 Viville
 Waltzing
 Weyler
 Wolberg

History

Roman and medieval times
Before the Roman conquests of Gaul, the territory of Arlon and a vast area to the southeast were settled by the Treveri, a Celtic tribe.  The local population adapted relatively easily to Roman culture.  The number and quality of sculpted stones and monuments that have been unearthed in the area demonstrate that the vicus of Orolaunum quickly became a commercial and administrative centre of Roman civilization.  The Germanic invasions of the 3rd century destroyed most of these early advances, despite the defensive walls that had been built on the Knipchen hill to protect the vicus.

During most of the Middle Ages, the population still used the earlier buildings such as the thermae.  In 1060, Waleran I of Limburg, Count of Arlon, built a castle on the Knipchen hill hill in the centre of the town. 

A dynasty of counts of Arlon began with Waleran I, Duke of Limburg. On the death of Duke Waleran III in 1226, Arlon passed to his son from the second marriage, Henry V the Fair, Count of Luxembourg, and became part of the county of Luxembourg. Thus, in the Tournament of Chauvency, his son Henry the Lion bore the title of Marquis of Arlon. 

In the 13th century, the only women's Cistercian abbey known to date was built in Clairefontaine.

15th century until the French Revolution
The Duchy of Luxembourg itself, of which Arlon was dependent, became part of the Burgundian Netherlands under Philip the Good in 1441.  After Charles V's abdication of his empire to his son Philip II of Spain in 1556, a troubled period started for the whole region with continuous wars involving France, Spain and the Southern Netherlands. In 1558, nearly half of the city, including its castle, was destroyed by the French troops of Duke François of Guise. In the 17th century, Capuchin friars built a convent on the ruins of the castle and the French strengthened the defensive walls according to Vauban's designs.  An accidental fire destroyed a large part of the city again in 1785.

Modern times

On 9 June 1793 the French Revolutionary troops opposed the Austrians just outside Arlon. The French emerged victorious and took over the city from Austrian rule. They expelled the Capuchin friars and used their convent as a hospital. 

In June 1815, after the defeat of Napoleon in the Battle of Waterloo, Arlon went back to government of the Grand Duchy. By the Treaty of London in 1839, the grand duchy became fully sovereign and in turn geographically larger western part of the duchy, i.e. the province de Luxembourg including Arlon city was given to newly created Kingdom of Belgium.

Arlon was one of the first victims of the German invasion in 1914 as 121 inhabitants were executed on 26 August, on the orders of Colonel Richard Karl von Tessmar.  

Its territory was again among the first to be invaded at the onset of World War II. Allies moved into Belgium on 10 May 1940 and Arlon was defended by French troops, but they were not able to stop the German invasion.

Arlon today
Being situated very close to the border with the Grand Duchy of Luxembourg, Arlon has continued to expand with new residential areas and commercial development zones, and many people cross the border everyday to work in the Grand Duchy.
All international express trains make a stop in Arlon, as it is the last station on the main Brussels—Luxembourg City railway line.

Sights

Arlon is best known for holding one of the richest archeological museums in Belgium.  It houses numerous examples of Roman sculpture and Merovingian funerary art.
A fragment of the Gallo-Roman defensive wall that was built in the 3rd century still stands in Arlon.
Saint Donat's church now stands on the Knipchen hill, where Waleran I of Limburg once built his castle and the Capuchin friars built their convent.
 Arlon cemetery has the largest Jewish section of all Walloon cemeteries.

Local customs
 The carnival of Arlon takes place at mid-Lent.  It includes the traditional handing of the city keys to the carnival prince and a colourful parade composed of various folk dance groups.
 The Maitrank (German for "drink of May") is the city's most popular refreshment.  It is made of white wine in which a local flower, the Asperula odorata, has macerated.  Some recipes also add cognac or substitute woodruff for the Asperula.  The Maitrank festivities take place in the city every fourth Sunday of May.

Demography 
The town of Arlon is the most populated of the municipalities in the province of Luxembourg, ahead of Marche-en-Famenne and Aubange. On the other hand, it is the least populated of the country's ten provinces.
On 31 December 2019, the city of Arlon had a total population of 30,047 inhabitants.

Politics 
List of mayors :

 Pierre Hollenfeltz
 1880–1901 : Joseph Netzer
 1901–1921 : Numa Ensch-Tesch
 1921–1949 : Paul Reuter
 1949–1958 : Jules Massonnet
 1958–1976 : Charles Simon
 1977–1988 : Jean Goffinet
 1989–1992 : Guy Larcier
 1993–1994 : Jean Goffinet
 1995–2006 : Guy Larcier
 2007–2012 : Raymond Biren
 2013–... : Vincent Magnus

People born in Arlon

Johann Kaspar Basselet von La Rosée, Bavarian general (1710–1795)
Godefroid Kurth, historian (1847–1916)
Jean-Marie Gaspar, sculptor (1861–1931)
Benoît Lamy, film director (1945–2008)
Ingrid Lempereur, swimmer (1969)
Jeroen van Busleyden, humanist (1470–1517)
Anthony Moris, Luxembourgish footballer (1990)
Timothy Castagne, Belgian footballer (1995)

International relations

Twin towns — sister cities
Arlon is twinned with:

 Saint-Dié-des-Vosges, France since 1962
 Diekirch, Luxemburg
 Bitburg, Rhineland-Palatinate, Germany since 1965
 Sulphur, Louisiana, United States
 Hayange, France
 Alba, Italy since 1 March 2004
 Market Drayton, England, UK

See also
 List of protected heritage sites in Arlon

References

External links

 Official site
  Alternative to official site 
  Official Maitrank web site 
 Official Saint-Martin parish website of Arlon city 

 
Cities in Wallonia
1221 disestablishments in Europe
Municipalities of Luxembourg (Belgium)
Provincial capitals of Wallonia
Counties of the Holy Roman Empire